Pyricularia is a genus of fungi which was named by Saccardo in 1880.

The polyphyletic nature of Pyricularia has been resolved and species of Pyricularia s. str. were shown to belong to a monophyletic clade (including Pyricularia grisea isolates), defining the family Pyriculariaceae.

Etymology 

The genus Pyricularia is named after the pyriform (pear-shaped) shape of its conidia.

Pathogenicity 
The genus Pyricularia includes species that are pathogenic on a wide range of monocot plants. For example, Pyricularia oryzae (sexual morph Magnaporthe oryzae), the causal agent of the rice blast disease, is one of the most widely distributed diseases of rice, and is highly destructive leading to up to 30% yield loss worldwide. Pyricularia oryzae isolates from rice are mostly host-specific and infect only few host plants beside rice (barley and Lolium). Pyricularia oryzae isolates from other host plants such as Eleusine, Setaria and Triticum are also host-specific, and unable to infect rice. The closely related species P. oryzae and Pyricularia grisea are indistinguishable in morphology of conidium, perithecium and ascopore. Pyricularia grisea isolates from Digitaria were shown to form a distinct clade by phylogenetic analysis and infect crabgrass (Digitaria), but not other hosts. However, some P. oryzae isolates from rice and other grasses and some P. grisea isolates from crabgrass were described to show cross-infectivity on crabgrass and rice, respectively.

Sexual morphs 
Sexual morphs were reported for P. grisea and P. oryzae. The genus Pyricularia comprises several other species for which the sexual morph has not yet been discovered.

Species

Pyricularia angulata
Pyricularia apiculata
Pyricularia borealis
Pyricularia buloloensis
Pyricularia caffra
Pyricularia cannae
Pyricularia cannicola
Pyricularia caricis
Pyricularia commelinicola
Pyricularia costi
Pyricularia costina
Pyricularia curcumae
Pyricularia cyperi
Pyricularia didyma
Pyricularia digitariae
Pyricularia distorta
Pyricularia dubiosa
Pyricularia ebbelsii
Pyricularia echinochloae
Pyricularia euphorbiae
Pyricularia fusispora
Pyricularia globbae
Pyricularia grisea
Pyricularia guarumaicola
Pyricularia juncicola
Pyricularia kookicola
Pyricularia lauri
Pyricularia leersiae
Pyricularia longispora
Pyricularia lourinae
Pyricularia luzulae
Pyricularia occidentalis
Pyricularia oncosperma
Pyricularia oryzae
Pyricularia panici-paludosi
Pyricularia parasitica
Pyricularia penniseti
Pyricularia peruamazonica
Pyricularia pyricularioides
Pyricularia rabaulensis
Pyricularia sansevieriae
Pyricularia scripta
Pyricularia setariae
Pyricularia sphaerulata
Pyricularia submersa
Pyricularia subsigmoidea
Pyricularia vandalurensis
Pyricularia variabilis
Pyricularia whetzelii
Pyricularia zingiberis
Pyricularia zizaniicola

Taxonomy 
Conidia are solitary, pyriform to obclavate, narrowed toward tip, rounded at the base, 2-septate, hyaline to pale brown, with a distinct basal hilum, sometimes with marginal frill.

Type species: Pyricularia grisea Sacc., Michelia 2(no. 6): 20. 1880.

Family 
Species of Pyricularia s. str. belong to a monophyletic clade that includes P. oryzae/P. grisea isolates, and was defined as Pyriculariaceae. Pyriculariaceae is sister to the Ophioceraceae, representing two novel families. These clades are clearly distinct from species belonging to the Gaeumannomyces pro parte/Magnaporthiopsis/Nakataea generic complex that are monophyletic and define the family Magnaporthaceae.

References

External links 

Sordariomycetes genera
Magnaporthales